Carabus parreyssi plassensis is a subspecies of beetle in the family Carabidae that can is endemic to Bosnia and Herzegovina.

References

parreyssi plassensis
Beetles described in 1907
Endemic fauna of Bosnia and Herzegovina